Franklin Scott Spears (August 20, 1931 – April 10, 1996) was a justice of the Supreme Court of Texas from January 1, 1979 to December 31, 1990.

References

Justices of the Texas Supreme Court
1931 births
1996 deaths
20th-century American judges